Yu Luming (born December 1961) is a former Chinese politician. As of April 2022 he was under investigation by China's top anti-corruption agency. Previously he served as vice chairman of the Beijing Municipal Committee of the Chinese People's Political Consultative Conference. He is a member of the 13th National Committee of the Chinese People's Political Consultative Conference.

Biography
A native of Beijing, Yu graduated from Beijing Medical College (now Peking University Health Science Center). He joined the Chinese Peasants' and Workers' Democratic Party in December 1986, and joined the Chinese Communist Party in June 1992. He worked in the Daxing District Government for a long time before being transferred to the Beijing Municipal People's Government. At the height of his political career, he was vice chairman of the Beijing Municipal Committee of the Chinese People's Political Consultative Conference, a position at vice-ministerial level.

Downfall
On 16 April 2022, he has been placed under investigation for "serious violations of discipline and laws" by the Central Commission for Discipline Inspection (CCDI), the party's internal disciplinary body, and the National Supervisory Commission, the highest anti-corruption agency of China. He was detained by the Supreme People's Procuratorate on July 29.

References

1968 births
Living people
Peking University alumni
People's Republic of China politicians from Beijing
Chinese Communist Party politicians from Beijing
Members of the 13th Chinese People's Political Consultative Conference